Gorm Wisweh (born in Svaneke, Denmark) is a Danish TV-cook, author of cooking books and the founder of Gorm's Pizza.

Background 
Gorm was born in Svaneke on Bornholm, his parents owned the local hotel. He started making pizzas for his friends when he was 11 or 12 years old. He moved to Copenhagen to study, but came back to Bornholm to make pizzas in his mother's cafe. It's was a success, people were driving far to get them.

He got married in 2018 and has two children.

Restaurants 
In 2008 he and five others opened the Italian restaurant Magstræde 16 in Copenhagen with him as the head chef. Later the opened more restaurants. 
He also founded Gorm's Pizza, and some Danish media have nicknamed him the Pizza King (Pizzakongen).

TV 
 2020 Maddysten: Co-host and judge, DR1
 2019 Over Atlanten, TV5
 2017 Vild med fisk, DR2
 2016 Vild med dans, TV2

Books 
 2016 Nordisk tang : en kogebog fra havet 
 2015 Mine Favoritter 
 2013 Gorm og 100% din ret 
 2011 Gorms gryder, Vandkunsten 
 2009 Pizza, Gyldendal

References 

Living people
Danish chefs

Year of birth missing (living people)